Open Your Window (German: Geh mach dein Fensterl auf) is a 1953 Austrian-German musical comedy film directed by Anton Kutter and starring Peter Pasetti, Elisabeth Stemberger and Gunther Philipp.

It was made as a co-production between a company based in Linz and one in Munich. The film's sets were designed by the art director Sepp Rothauer.

Cast
 Peter Pasetti 
 Elisabeth Stemberger 
 Gunther Philipp
 Ilse Peternell 
 Hans Olden 
 Gustl Gstettenbaur 
 Karl Skraup
 Joachim Fuchsberger

References

Bibliography 
 Robert von Dassanowsky. Austrian Cinema: A History. McFarland, 2005.

External links 
 

1953 films
1953 musical comedy films
Austrian musical comedy films
German musical comedy films
West German films
1950s German-language films
Films directed by Anton Kutter
German black-and-white films
Austrian black-and-white films
1950s German films